The 1969 Giro d'Italia was the 52nd edition of the Giro d'Italia, one of cycling's Grand Tours. The  race consisted of 23 stages, one of which was a split stage, starting in Garda on 16 May and finishing Milan on 8 June. There were two time trial stages and a single rest day. Felice Gimondi of the Salvarani team won the overall general classification, his second victory. Italians Claudio Michelotto (Max Meyer) placed second, 3 min and 35 s slower than Gimondi, and Italo Zilioli (Filotex) was third, over four minutes behind Gimondi.

Eddy Merckx, who was leading the general classification, was excluded from the race after an extremely controversial anti-doping control in Savona.

Teams

A total of 13 teams were invited to participate in the 1969 Giro d'Italia. Each team sent a squad of ten riders, so the Giro began with a peloton of 130 cyclists. Riders of Italian nationality numbered the most with 113, while Belgium had the second most with eight. Out of the 130 riders that started this edition of the Giro d'Italia, a total of 81 riders made it to the finish in Milan.

The teams that took part in the race were:

Pre-race favorites

Eddy Merckx (Faema), the previous year's winner returned to defend his crown. He arrived in Italy amid a great season already with victories in the three Monuments Milan–San Remo, Tour of Flanders, and Liège–Bastogne–Liège. Merckx named Felice Gimondi his top rival for the upcoming race. Both Merckx and 1967 champion Gimondi were viewed as the principal favorites to win the race. Gimondi had won the Tour de Romandie and placed second in the Tour of Flanders. Both riders hoped to achieve the Giro–Tour double, for the first time since Jacques Anquetil achieved it in 1964. Gimondi had previously attempted the feat in 1965 and 1967. Merckx had specifically hoped to ride a conservative race in order to help his chances to complete the double.

Reigning world champion Vittorio Adorni who placed second the year before was viewed as a rider who could challenge the Gimondi–Merckx duel, despite being winless that season so far. Filotex's Italo Zilioli and Franco Bitossi were other riders who were speculated to challenge for high general classification positions. Top sprinters entering the race were Molteni's Michele Dancelli and Marino Basso.

Spanish and French rider participation was lacking, as the former had only a single team entered and there were zero French riders competing. Notable absences included Gianni Motta and Franco Balmamion.

Route and stages

The route was revealed on 27 March 1969 by race director Vincenzo Torriani. The announced route covered , across twenty-four stages of racing. In total the route traversed 600 municipalities over 44 provinces. The route featured 26 categorized climbs that awarded points for the mountains classification, including eight of which were being scaled for the first time in race history. Five of those climbs would be stage finishes for the race. The route started flat before the first important stages pertaining to the general classification would be in the ninth and tenth stages. The rest day took place in San Marino on 31 May.

The race started in Garda and made its way south and west across the Apennines. Then the race headed south until Potenza before turning north until reaching San Marino for two stages. The race transferred to Parma and headed east again and entered the Dolomites. Traversing the Dolomites, the race headed west until its finish in Milan.

Race overview

The twentieth stage of the race from Trento to Marmolada started at 8:30 AM local time and by around 1 PM the weather was worsening and this lead race organizers to change the route in order to go through Fiera di Primiero. However, the weather there was even worse and the Torriani elected to neutralize the stage after  of racing.

Following Merckx's disqualification from the race, there were rumors of riders protests. The race started an hour later than intended and the race stopped briefly in front of Merckx's hotel in an act of solidarity. Gimondi, who was promoted to first place, refused to wear the pink jersey during the seventeenth stage. However, the stage went on and the winning breakaway started roughly 30 kilometers from the race finish, with Ole Ritter attacking to win ahead of the fifteen other riders in the move. The mood of the peloton and the race's caravan was described as dismayed.

Doping

The race had doping controls and the top two riders in the general classification were drug tested after each stage, along with two other cyclists chosen at random. A mobile lab that traveled with the race and conducted the drug tests. 

On 2 June, it was announced that the race leader Merckx had tested positive. Merckx's first test came up positive for fencamfamine, an amphetamine and a second test confirmed the positive. The word spread about Merckx's positive test while Merckx himself was still asleep. The media was able to enter Merckx's room at the Albissola Superiore as the news broke to him, where he stated "I'm sure I didn't take any doping product," as he cried on his hotel bed. Fellow riders, including Gimondi, and team directors stopped by to express their solidarity with Merckx as he faced the news.

The positive test meant Merckx was to be suspended for a month. Race director Vincenzo Torriani delayed the start of the seventeenth stage in an attempt to persuade the president of the Italian Cycling Federation to allow Merckx to begin the stage. However, the president was not in his office and Torriani was forced to start the stage, disqualifying Merckx in the process. Union Cycliste Internationale (UCI) president Adriano Rodoni announced an investigation into the situation, which, in the succeeding days, resulted in the removal of the suspension.

The reaction to Merckx's expulsion was wide. Many writers sided with Merckx stating how he tested negative every other time in the race to that point before the positive on his final test. Several pointed to his clean track record and willingness to take doping controls whenever approached. A writer made note that it was widely known that riders took stimulants at the time, otherwise the pace of racing could not be kept at what it was at the time. At the time the list of banned substances varied from country to country. There were some riders that threatened to strike at the start of the seventeenth stage. Some writers stated that the Giro was over at that point, and one went as far as to say that this might be the death of the Giro. There were hypotheses that he had consumed tainted food. Fellow cyclists also sided with Merckx, Taccone stated "It was sabotage, while Gimondi commented that if he were to win the race overall, it would have no meaning since he could not best Merckx. On the other hand, Rudi Altig told the media: "The law must be respected. If it had been a runner in the background, there would be no scandal. He would have been disqualified without any other form of trial. Merckx, on the other hand, is the victim, and that is why the case is experiencing such a twist." Former cyclist Marino Vigna and Faema co–director mentioned that Merckx could not have taken a tampered bottle from the ‘’tifosi’’ as he warned Merckx “from the start of the Giro against the danger of refueling during the stage by the public,” further saying that Merckx never accepted bottles from fans. However, he did say that Merckx could have gotten a bottle from a teammate that got one from a spectator.

Classification leadership

Two different jerseys were worn during the 1969 Giro d'Italia. The leader of the general classification – calculated by adding the stage finish times of each rider – wore a pink jersey. This classification is the most important of the race, and its winner is considered as the winner of the Giro.

For the points classification, which awarded a red jersey to its leader, cyclists were given points for finishing a stage in the top 15. The mountains classification leader. The climbs were ranked in first and second categories. In this ranking, points were won by reaching the summit of a climb ahead of other cyclists. Although no jersey was awarded, there was also one classification for the teams, in which the stage finish times of the best three cyclists per team were added; the leading team was the one with the lowest total time.

Final standings

General classification

Mountains classification

Points classification

Neoprofessional classification

Teams classification

References

Footnotes

Citations

Bibliography

 
Giro d'Italia by year
Giro d'Italia
Giro d'Italia
Giro d'Italia
Giro d'Italia
1969 Super Prestige Pernod